Rodolfo Eduardo III Sulia Herrera (born August 8, 2002) is a Puerto Rican football player who currently plays as a defender for Puerto Rico Sol in the Liga Puerto Rico.

Club career

Sulia joined the reserve squad of Club Gimnasia y Esgrima of Argentina’s Primera Nacional from local side Mirabelli SA in 2019.

In February 2020 Sulia went on trial with North Texas SC of USL League One. He was originally identified by North Texas SC in 2019 when he trialed with its parent club, FC Dallas of Major League Soccer.

In October 2020 Sulia joined Satélite Norte FC of the  Copa Simón Bolívar, the second tier league of Bolivia.

By 2021 he had joined reigning Liga Puerto Rico champions Metropolitan FA as it prepared for its 2021 Caribbean Club Championship campaign.

On June 9, 2021, Sulia and fellow Puerto Rican Joel Serrano joined National Independent Soccer Association club Chicago House AC.

Career statistics

International

References

2002 births
Living people
People from Carolina, Puerto Rico
Puerto Rican footballers
Puerto Rican expatriate footballers
Puerto Rico international footballers
Association football defenders
Expatriate footballers in Argentina
Expatriate footballers in Bolivia